The Center for Tissue Regeneration and Engineering at Dayton (TREND) is a research center which focuses on tissue regeneration and is partnered with the National Institutes of Health, the National Science Foundation, Air Force Research Laboratory, and Ethicon Endo-Surgery. The center is located in Dayton, Ohio. The center has around 20 employees and funding for research comes 70 percent federal, 20 percent industry, 10 percent foundations or nonprofit organizations.

References

External links
 Center for Tissue Regeneration and Engineering at Dayton

University of Dayton
Healthcare in Dayton, Ohio